P. N. Ramchandar Rao (పీ.ఎన్.రామచంద్ర రావు) is an Indian film director, producer who has worked on Telugu and few Kannada and Tamil films.

Born in Chadalavada village, PNR's lived in childhood Parlapalli Village, Nellore dist. till he moved to Chennai to join in films,

In 1973, he joined P. Chandrashekar Reddy, a well-known Film director who also hails from Nellore and worked for the film Kottha Kapuram starring Krishna S.V. Ranga Rao, Bharathi Gummadi and others.

Career
P. N. Ramachandra Rao is a telugu film director and  producer, with his friends as partners, and produced couple of hits like Gandhinagar Rendava Veedhi and Chitram Bhalare Vichitram (1991) in his direction. He produced total 12 films till now.

Filmography

Merupu Daadi (Telugu) (1984) (Introduced actress Devi opposite Bhanuchander)
"Private Master" (Telugu) 
Gandhinagar Rendava Vedette (Telugu) (1987)
Master Kapuram (Telugu) (1990) (Introduced Sudharani, as Heroine. Later she became top heroine in Kannada. This movie won two Nandi (AP state award) awards for Best Supporting actor Velu and Best Dialogue writer Gollapudi Maruthi Rao)
Chitram Bhalare Vichitram (Telugu) (1991) 
Pelli Neeku Shobhanam Naku (Telugu) (1992)
Bombat Hendthi (Kannada) (1992)
"Asale Pellaina Vaanni" (Telugu) 
Leader (Telugu) (1995) (Introduced Priyaraman as Heroine)
Subhavartha (Telugu) (1998)
Jodi Simhagallu (Kannada) (1999)
"Jackpot" (Producer) (Telugu) (2001) 
Golmaal (Telugu) (2003) 

Television Series

"Bhakta Markandeya" (2000) (telecasted in E TV) (Telugu) (Jr.NTR as Teen lead character 'Markandeya')

References

External links

Film directors from Andhra Pradesh
Tamil film directors
Telugu film directors
Kannada film directors
20th-century Indian film directors
21st-century Indian film directors
Living people
1955 births